The Swiss Bowl is the annual national championship game in the sport of American football in Switzerland, first held in 1986. It is contested by the two best teams of the Nationalliga A.

The Calanda Broncos are the record winners of the Swiss Bowl, with eleven successful participations. The Calanda Broncos hold the record for consecutive titles, five between 2009 and 2013.

The most-played Swiss Bowl game is Calanda Broncos versus Basel Gladiators, having been played six times, with Calanda winning the first five encounters of the two teams. The Basel Gladiators and the Geneva Seahawks are the most unsuccessful teams, having lost seven of their eight Swiss Bowl appearances.

Swiss Bowls 
The Swiss Bowls since 1986:.

By game 

 Champions in bold.

By team 

 † Bold denotes Swiss Bowl victory.

References

External links
 Official Swissbowl website  
 Swiss American Football Association website  
 Football History  Historic American football tables from Germany & Europe

Recurring sporting events established in 1986
Annual events in Switzerland
1986 establishments in Switzerland
American football in Switzerland
American football bowls in Europe